The Ancient temple near Livadhja, Vlorë County, Albania, is a Cultural Monument of Albania.

References

Cultural Monuments of Albania
Buildings and structures in Finiq
Temples in Albania